Etta Is Betta Than Evvah! is a studio album by Etta James, released in 1976. It was her final studio album for Chess Records.

Critical reception
AllMusic wrote that "the songs are just kind of generic: good-enough uptempo dance cuts and midtempo groovers, songs that give enough space for Etta but never really escape the confines of average '70s disco-oriented R&B." The Sunday Times wrote that the album "mixes tough funk and bluesy soul ballads."

Track listing

Personnel
Etta James - vocals
Brian Ray, Ken Marco, Tommy Keith, Walter Morris - guitar
Chuck Rainey, Fred Beckmeier, Jonathan Williams - bass
Bernadette Randle, William Smith - keyboards
Brian Cuomo - piano
Clarence Oliver, Kenny Rice, Paul Mabry - drums
King Errisson - congas, percussion
Ron Stockert - clavinet on "Woman (Shake Your Booty)"
Ron Rancifer - organ on "Woman (Shake Your Booty)"
Gene Dinwiddie - saxophone on "Woman (Shake Your Booty)"
Keith Johnson - trumpet on "Woman (Shake Your Booty)"

Production
Michael Zagaris - photography

References

1976 albums
Etta James albums
Chess Records albums